Coal Hollow is an unincorporated community in Bureau County, Illinois, United States, located on U.S. Route 6, east of Princeton.

References

Unincorporated communities in Bureau County, Illinois
Unincorporated communities in Illinois